Berhida is a town in Veszprém county, Hungary.

References

Populated places in Veszprém County